The men's pole vault event at the 2011 All-Africa Games was held on 14 September. There were only two contestants, both of them Algerian decathletes.

Results

References
Results
Results

Pole